Saamoohya Paadam is a 1996 Indian Malayalam film, directed by Kareem and produced by T. K. Surendran and Pradeep Chembakassery. The film stars Dileep, Prem Kumar, Sukumari and  Kalabhavan Mani in the lead roles. The film has musical score by S. P. Venkatesh. Songs were penned by Konniyoor Balachandran ( Kavalam kiliye) and Shibu Chakravarthy.

Cast
 
Dileep as Vishnu
Prem Kumar  as Raghuraman
Reshmi Soman as Sreedevi
Keerthana as Ammu
Kalabhavan Mani as K. K. Karunan
Rajan P. Dev as Kunjanandan Nair
Sukumari as Bhavaniyamma
Mala Aravindan as Pushpangathan
Paravoor Bharathan as Lambodaran Pilla
Kozhikode Narayanan Nair as Swadeshi Master
Bindu Panicker as Premalatha
Kanakalatha as Kanakalatha
Jose Pellissery as Lonappan
Ravi Menon as Chandrappan
Tony as Devan

Soundtrack
The music was composed by S. P. Venkatesh.

References

External links
  
 

1996 films
1990s Malayalam-language films